Danny Breitfelder (born 19 February 1997) is a German footballer who plays as a forward for TSV Steinbach.

References

External links
 

1997 births
Living people
People from Lauchhammer
German footballers
Footballers from Brandenburg
Association football forwards
Chemnitzer FC players
FSV Union Fürstenwalde players
Sportfreunde Lotte players
ZFC Meuselwitz players
FC Rot-Weiß Koblenz players
TSV Steinbach Haiger players
3. Liga players
Regionalliga players